Sir George Chute, 1st Baronet (10 February 1665 – 4 February 1722), of Hinxhill Place, in the County of Kent, was an English politician. He was a Member of Parliament (MP) for Winchelsea from 1696 to 1698.  He was made a baronet, of Hinxhill Place in the County of Kent, on 17 September 1684. The title became extinct on his death in February 1722, aged 56.

References

1665 births
1722 deaths
Baronets in the Baronetage of England
People from the Borough of Ashford
Place of birth missing
English MPs 1695–1698